The Reynard 96D is an open-wheel formula race car, designed and developed by Malcolm Oastler, and constructed and built by Reynard Motorsport, for use in the Japanese Formula Nippon series, in 1996.

References 

Open wheel racing cars
Reynard Motorsport vehicles
Super Formula